White Hollow may refer to:

White Hollow (Iron County, Missouri), a valley in Missouri
White Hollow (Wayne County, Missouri), a valley in Missouri